I'm Not Feeling Myself Tonight is a 1976 British comedy film directed by Joseph McGrath and starring Barry Andrews, James Booth and Sally Faulkner.

Cast
 Barry Andrews as Jon Pigeon 
 James Booth as S.J. Nutbrown 
 Sally Faulkner as Cheryl Bascombe 
 Ben Aris as Trampas B. Hildebrand 
 Billy Hamon as Keith Furey 
 Ronnie Brody as Neighbour 
 Freddie Earlle as Cowboy 
 Bob Godfrey as Postman 
 Marjie Lawrence as Caretaker's Wife 
 Brian Murphy as Caretaker 
 Chic Murray as Fred 
 Graham Stark as Hotel M.C. 
 Katya Wyeth as Wendy 
 Rita Webb as Tea Lady 
 Steve Amber as Policeman 
 Penny Croft as Traffic Warden 
 Robert Dorning as Man at Party 
 Mike Grady as Boy Scout 
 Sally Harrison as Woman on Video Tape 
 Geraldine Hart as Mrs. Watchtower 
 Bill Maelor-Jones as Lecturer 
 Juliette King as Heidi 
 Andria Lawrence as Mrs. Nutbrown 
 Gracie Luck as Mrs. Hildebrand 
 Gennie Nevinson as Vera 
 Marianne Stone as Consultant 
 Pat Astley as Barmaid
Jeannie Collings as Sylvia
 Mary Millington as Girl in Sunglasses
 Andee Cromarty as Party Guest
 Monika Ringwald as Party Guest

Production

Filming
The film was shot at Twickenham Studios.

References

Bibliography
 Hunt, Leon. British Low Culture: From Safari Suits to Sexploitation. Psychology Press, 1998.

External links 
 

1976 films
1970s sex comedy films
British sex comedy films
1970s English-language films
Films directed by Joseph McGrath (film director)
Films shot at Twickenham Film Studios
1976 comedy films
1970s British films